Bernard Packington, D.D.  was Archdeacon of Cork  from 1662 until his resignation in 1674.

References

Alumni of Trinity College Dublin
17th-century Irish Anglican priests
Archdeacons of Cork